Trinitrotriazine, or 2,4,6-trinitro-1,3,5-triazine, is a theoretical explosive compound. Synthesis of this compound has been elusive despite its simple structure, as conventional nitration of triazine becomes increasingly more difficult as more nitro groups are added. A successful route would more likely proceed by trimerisation of nitryl cyanide. The precursor nitryl cyanide was first synthesized by Rahm et al. in 2014.

Trinitrotriazine has a neutral oxygen balance, potentially making it a very powerful explosive, though calculations predict it would be fairly unstable and inferior to the related compound 3,6-dinitro-1,2,4,5-tetrazine.

See also
 RDX (hexahydro-1,3,5-trinitro-1,3,5-triazine)

References

Explosive chemicals
Triazines
Nitro compounds
Hypothetical chemical compounds